Home at Last may refer to:

 Home at Last (Billy Ray Cyrus album), 2007
 Home at Last (Glen Campbell album), 1997
 Home at Last (Larry Norman album), 1989
 Home At Last (horse), a thoroughbred horse that won the 1990 Super Derby
 Home at Last (web series), a comedy series starring William Russ
 Home at Last, a story from The Railway Series book "The Little Old Engine"
 Home at Last (Steely Dan song)